Julian Jansen (born 12 November 2002) is a Dutch Footballer who plays for Derde Divisie club FC Rijnvogels

Club Career 
Jansen started his Football career playing for Bolton Wanderers u18 in 2019, later moving to Dutch side HBS Craeyenhout u19. Jansen signed his first professional contract with Serie D side Sancataldese Calcio, making his full league debut on the 26th of September 2021 against Real Agro Aversa. 

In January 2022 Jansen signed for English side St Helens Town where he played for the remainder of the season.

On the 14th of October 2022 Jansen joined FC Rijnvogels, making his debut on the 15th of October against Staphorst.

References

External links 
Julian Jansen at ESPN
Julian Jansen on Instagram
Julian Jansen at Soccerway

2002 births
Living people